Dame Laura Mary Cox,  (born 8 November 1951), styled The Hon. Mrs Justice Cox, is a former English High Court judge of the Queen's Bench Division, serving from 2002 until her retirement in 2016. Before serving on the bench, she was a barrister who specialised in employment law, discrimination and human rights.

Affiliations
Head of Cloisters Chambers, Temple (1995–2002)
Chairperson of the Bar Council Sex Discrimination Committee (1995–99) and Equal Opportunities Committee (1999–2002)
Bencher of the Inner Temple; member of the Independent Human Rights Organization Justice (former Council member) and *Lawyers of Liberty (the National Council for Civil Liberties), co-founder
Vice-President of the Institute of Employment Rights
Panel of Experts advising the Cambridge University Independent Review of Discrimination Legislation, panel member
Honorary Fellow of Queen Mary College, London University (2005)
Council of the University of London (2003–06), member
President of the Association of Women Barristers
United Kingdom Association of Women Judges, committee member

High Court/DBE
She was appointed as a Queen's Bench Division judge in the High Court on 4 November 2002, and was awarded, as customary, a damehood (DBE).

References

External links
Kent.ac.uk
Hmcourts-service.gov.uk
Thelawyer.com

1951 births
Living people
Alumni of Queen Mary University of London
English barristers
English King's Counsel
English women judges
Dames Commander of the Order of the British Empire
Queen's Bench Division judges
20th-century King's Counsel
21st-century King's Counsel
British women lawyers
20th-century women lawyers
20th-century English women
20th-century English people